Juniperus komarovii is a species of conifer in the family Cupressaceae. It is found only in China.

References

External links
 

komarovii
Near threatened plants
Endemic flora of China
Taxonomy articles created by Polbot